Adella Kean Zametkin (born Adella Emanuelovna Khean; October 12, 1863 – May 19, 1931) was a Russian-born Jewish-American writer and activist.

Life 
Zametkin was born on October 12, 1863 in Mohyliv-Podilskyi, Tsarist Russia as Adella Emanuelovna Khean. Her parents were saloon-keepers.

Zametkin was given private lessons from a tutor at an early age, and as a young woman was a tutor herself to poor girls. She immigrated to America in 1888 and quickly gravitated towards the socialist movement. She participated in the Socialist Labor Party, lectured in women's groups, and contributed to leading socialist publications. She helped found The Forward in 1897 and worked as its cashier. She wrote and lectured on women's issues like nutrition, hygiene, birth control, and child education. She focused on aiding Americanizing poor Jews in the Lower East Side, and was credited with organizing several women's organizations.

In 1918, Zametkin began running a weekly column in Der Tog called Fun a froy tsu froyen (From one woman/wife to another), which was soon supplemented by a second weekly column called In der froyen velt (In the world of women/wives). The columns included mainly advice on household management like cooking tips and recipes as well as teaching women about topics like microbes and the importance of getting fresh air, with the goal of making Jewish working-class immigrant more educated of modern American society She also wrote about history, science, notable women like Florence Nightingale.

Zametkin translated several books into Yiddish, including Nikolay Chernyshevsky's What is to Be Done and Émile Zola's La Bête humaine. In 1930, she published Der froys handbukh (The woman’s handbook).

In 1928, Zametkin ran for the New York State Assembly as a Socialist in Queens County's 4th District, losing to Republican Robert J. Hunt. She ran again in the same district in 1929, losing to Democrat Joseph D. Nunan. She ran for a third time in the district in 1930, losing to Democrat James A. Burke. The district was in Jamaica, Queens. While she lost each election, she polled more votes than any other previous Socialist candidate had in the district.

In 1889, she married Jewish labor leader Michael Zametkin. They had a son and two daughters, including Laura Z. Hobson.

Death
Zametkin died following a long illness at Presbyterian Hospital on May 19, 1931.

References

External links 

 The Political Graveyard

1863 births
1931 deaths
People from Mohyliv-Podilskyi
People from Mogilyovsky Uyezd (Podolian Governorate)
American people of Ukrainian-Jewish descent
Jews from the Russian Empire
Emigrants from the Russian Empire to the United States
Jewish American community activists
Jewish American journalists
Jewish American trade unionists
New York (state) socialists
Members of the Socialist Labor Party of America
Socialist Party of America politicians from New York (state)
American women journalists
Journalists from New York City
20th-century American journalists
Translators to Yiddish
Yiddish-language journalists
Politicians from Queens, New York
People from Jamaica, Queens